A cranial nerve nucleus is a collection of neurons (gray matter) in the brain stem that is associated with one or more of the cranial nerves. Axons carrying information to and from the cranial nerves form a synapse first at these nuclei. Lesions occurring at these nuclei can lead to effects resembling those seen by the severing of nerve(s) they are associated with. All the nuclei except that of the trochlear nerve (CN IV) supply nerves of the same side of the body.

Structure

Motor and sensory
In general, motor nuclei are closer to the front (ventral), and sensory nuclei and neurons are closer to the back (dorsal). This arrangement mirrors the arrangement of tracts in the spinal cord.
 Close to the midline are the motor efferent nuclei, such as the oculomotor nucleus, which control skeletal muscle. Just lateral to this are the autonomic (or visceral) efferent nuclei.
 There is a separation, called the sulcus limitans, and lateral to this are the sensory nuclei. Near the sulcus limitans are the visceral afferent nuclei, namely the solitary tract nucleus.
 More lateral, but also less posterior, are the general somatic afferent nuclei. This is the trigeminal nucleus. Back at the dorsal surface of the brainstem, and more lateral are the special somatic afferents, this handles sensation such as balance.
 Another area, not on the dorsum of the brainstem, is where the special visceral efferents nuclei reside. These formed from the pharyngeal arches, in the embryo. This area is a bit below the autonomic motor nuclei, and includes the nucleus ambiguus, facial nerve nucleus, as well as the motor part of the trigeminal nerve nucleus.

Location
This list documents nuclei by the part of the brain they are found in:

 Red nucleus - motor, extrapyramidal
 Trochlear nucleus (IV) - motor
 Oculomotor nucleus (III) - motor
 Edinger-Westphal nucleus (III) - visceromotor

 Cochlear nuclei (VIII) - sensory
 Dorsal cochlear nucleus
 Ventral cochlear nucleus
 Vestibular nuclei (VIII) - sensory
 Salivary nuclei - visceromotor
 Inferior salivary nucleus (IX)
 Superior salivary nucleus (VII)
 Facial nucleus (VII) - motor
 Abducens nucleus (VI) - motor
 Trigeminal motor nucleus (V) - motor
 Main trigeminal nucleus (V) - sensory (fine touch and vibration)

 Hypoglossal nucleus (XII) - motor
 Dorsal motor nucleus of vagus nerve (X) - visceromotor
 Nucleus ambiguus (IX, X, XI) - motor
 Solitary nucleus (VII, IX, X) - sensory
 Spinal trigeminal nucleus (V) - sensory (crude touch, temperature and pain)
 Inferior olivary nucleus afferent fibres to cerebellum

Location

References
 Lennart Heimer, The Human Brain,

Additional images

External links
 
 Slides at Colorado College

 
Brainstem